Tambaga or Tambarga is a town and seat of the Tambaga Department in Tapoa Province in south-eastern Burkina Faso. As of 2005, the village has a population of 28,633 although current estimates are nearer 36,000.

References

External links
Satellite map at Maplandia.com

Populated places in the Est Region (Burkina Faso)
Tapoa Province